Sarah Cobcroft (1772 – 1857) was a midwife and farmer who emigrated from England to Australia. She arrived in Sydney, Colony of New South Wales on 28 June 1790 aboard Neptune, as part of the Second Fleet.

Biography

Sarah Cobcroft (née Smith), 16 of Chelmsford, Essex was one of a small of group of women and their children who embarked on Neptune in late 1789. They had accepted a government offer of a free passage to the colony for the wives or de facto partners of convicts on the second fleet. Cobcroft was the common law wife of John Cobcroft (1763–1853), who had been sentenced to life in the Colony, along with John Wood and William Fielder, for assault and highway robbery. They did not marry until 24 December 1842 at the Macquarie Schoolhouse in Wilberforce, New South Wales, when John was 79 and she was 70.

Some publications have incorrectly identified her as a female convict of the same name who arrived on Neptune, Cobcroft stated in her 1825 memorial that she had come free to the colony together with six other females sent out by Government for the purpose of practising midwifery per ship Neptune as part of the Second Fleet to arrive in the Colony of New South Wales. It seems almost certain that she embarked as John Cobcroft’s de facto wife. Two of the other women who embarked on Neptune were legally married to John Wood and William Fielder, who had been convicted with John Cobcroft for crimes pertaining to highway robbery.

John Cobcroft was granted a conditional pardon on 12 December 1794 by  Lieutenant Governor Francis Grose. On 22 July 1795 he was granted 30 acres of land at Wilberforce, New South Wales by Lieutenant-Governor William Paterson.

References

19th-century Australian people
Australian farmers
English emigrants to colonial Australia
English midwives
Australian midwives